Nigeria is a country in West Africa, it shares land borders with the Republic of Benin to the west, Chad and Cameroon to the east, and Niger to the north. Its coast lies on the Gulf of Guinea in the south and it borders Lake Chad to the northeast. Notable geographical features in Nigeria include the Adamawa Plateau, Mambilla Plateau, Jos Plateau, Obudu Plateau, the Niger River, Benue River, and Niger Delta.

Nigeria is found in the tropics, where the climate is seasonally damp and very humid. Nigeria is affected by four climate types; these climate types are generally gradated from south to north.

With an area of 923,768 km², Nigeria's principal streams are the Niger, where it got its name from, and the Benue, the primer of the Niger. The country's most elevated point is Chappal Waddi (or Gangirwal) with 2,419 m (7,936 ft.), situated in the Adamawa mountains in the Gashaka-Gumti Public Park, Taraba State, on the boundary with Cameroon.

Its Capital city is Abuja, situated in the focal point of the country, while Lagos is the country's essential port, monetary center and the biggest city. Communicated in dialects are English (official), Hausa, Igbo, and Yoruba. It is assessed that Nigeria has around 250 different ethno-etymological gatherings.

Climate

The tropical monsoon climate, designated by the Köppen climate classification as "Am", is found in the southern part of the country. This climate is influenced by the monsoons originating from the South Atlantic Ocean, which are brought into the country by the (maritime tropical) MT air mass, a warm moist sea-to-land seasonal wind. Its warmth and high humidity gives it a strong tendency to ascend and produce copious rainfall, which is a result of the condensation of water vapour in the rapidly rising air. The tropical monsoon climate has a very small temperature range.

The southern part of Nigeria experiences heavy and abundant rainfall. These storms are usually convectional in nature because of the region's proximity to the equatorial belt. The annual rainfall received in this region is very high. The southern region of Nigeria experiences a double rainfall maxima characterised by two high rainfall peaks, with a short dry season and a longer dry season falling between and after each peaks. The first rainy season begins around March and last to the end of July with a peak in June, this rainy season is followed by a short dry break in August known as the August break which is a short dry season lasting for two to three weeks in August. This break is broken by the short rainy season starting around early September and lasting to mid October with a peak period at the end of September. The ending of the short rainy season in October is followed by long dry season. This period starts from late October and lasts until early March with peak dry conditions between early December and late February.

The tropical savanna climate (Aw) or tropical wet and dry climate is extensive in area and covers most of western to central Nigeria, where it exerts enormous influence on the region. This climate makes up the vast majority of the country and is marked by distinct rainy and dry seasons with a single peak known as the summer maximum. Temperatures are above  throughout the year. The dry season occurs from December to March and is hot and dry with the Harmattan wind, a continental tropical (CT) air mass laden with dust from the Sahara, prevailing throughout this period.

With the Intertropical Convergence Zone swinging northward over West Africa from the Southern Hemisphere in April, heavy showers coming from pre-monsoonal convective clouds mainly in the form of squall lines also known as the north easterlies formed mainly as a result of the interactions of the two dominant airmasses in Nigeria known as the maritime tropical (south westerlies) and the continental tropical (north easterlies), begins in central Nigeria while monsoons arrive in July, bringing with it high humidity, heavy cloud cover and heavy rainfall lasting until September when the monsoons gradually begin retreating southward to the southern part of Nigeria.

A hot semi-arid climate (BSh) is predominant within the Sahel in the northern part of Nigeria. Annual rainfall totals are low. The rainy season in the northern part of Nigeria lasts for three to four months (June–September).

Alpine climate or highland climate or mountain climate are found on highlands regions in Nigeria. Because of the location in the tropics, this elevation is high enough to reach the temperate climate line in the tropics thereby giving the highlands, mountains and the plateau regions standing above this height, a cool mountain climate.

Rainfall 
Rainfall in the coastal belt of the Niger Delta is heavy due to the closeness of the Delta region to the equator. Annual rainfall totals vary from 2,400 to over 4,000 millimeters.

Niger Delta cities and their annually rainfall totals in millimeters:

 Warri — 2,730 mm
 Forcados (coastal town in the Niger Delta) — 4,870 mm
 Port Harcourt — 2,400 mm
 Calabar (coastal city) — 3,070 mm (rainiest city with over one million people in Nigeria)
 Bonny (south of Port Harcourt) — 4,200 mm

Trade winds

Tropical maritime air mass

The tropical maritime air mass (MT) is responsible for Nigeria's rainy season. This wind begins in February in the southern part of Nigeria while it takes longer for the wind to fully cover the whole of the country, reaching the northern part of Nigeria in June. Its presence a result of the northward retreat of the Harmattan. The northward retreat of the tropical continental air mass (CT) is caused by the sun's northward shift from the tropic of capricorn in the southern hemisphere to the tropic of cancer in the northern hemisphere. This shift begins from February and ends in June, when the sun is fully overhead at the tropic of cancer. During this northward migration of the sun as a result of the earth tilting along its axis, the sun crosses the equator (around March), moving over West Africa. West Africa comes directly under the sun at this time. The whole of West Africa is heated intensely as result of the increased insolation.

The high temperatures coupled with an increase in insolation cause a region of low pressure to develop over West Africa and Nigeria between March to May. The tropical continental air mass from the Sahara is weakened by the overheating of the land surface. This transfer of heat in turn causes the atmosphere to expand and become lighter. The air mass loses its strength around February in the southern part of Nigeria to June in northern Nigeria and begins to retreat coupled with the rising of air in form of convection within this air mass, further weakening the dominance of the wind over West Africa. The air mass finally retreats from most of Nigeria around April to May. The sun's rays enters into the atmosphere of Nigeria more intense than it does during the Harmattan, which contains dust and haze. The heating of the West Africa land mass creates a low pressure region over West Africa. This low pressure zone aid in the development of the tropical maritime air mass from the south Atlantic.

The tropical maritime air mass is a warm, humid and unstable trade wind. Convection currents form within the airmass whenever there is little instability in the airmass as a result of a slight to a very high orographic uplift in mountainous regions like the Obudu Plateau or the heating of the land which can trigger the formation of cumulonimbus cloud leading to thunderstorms within the air mass. During the dominance of the tropical maritime air mass, mornings are bright and sunny, the sun's heating of the land in the mornings and afternoons sets up convectional currents, these currents rise vertically, cumulonimbus clouds are formed, and torrential downpours can occur in the afternoon.

The African easterly wave is another major contributor of rainfall during the summer monsoons months of May to September. The nature of this wave changes at about 15 degrees north latitude. The waves that pass south of this latitude carry moisture and create convection that leads to rain clouds. Nigeria's location in the wetter part of the easterly waves south of the 15 degrees north latitude creates wetter climatic conditions for Nigeria, especially during the monsoons.

Tropical continental air mass
The tropical continental air mass, locally known as the Harmattan, is a wind originating from North Africa which crosses the Sahara into West Africa. This air mass dominates Nigeria's climate during the dry season from December to March. The tropical continental air mass is dusty and creates a haze within the atmosphere when it predominates. The haze is as a result of the dust within the air mass limiting visibility and blocking much of the sun's rays from reaching the earth. It is also a dry air mass formed over land in an area close to the equator. The air mass generally has no precipitation since it forms in the Sahara, generating dust rather than moisture. The air mass creates low visibility which hampers transportation, but its presence brings some relief to farmers since the low humidity present in the air quickens the drying of their crops.

Temperature 
Nigeria's seasons and temperature variance are determined by rainfall with rainy season and dry season being the major seasons in Nigeria. The rainy season of Nigeria brings in cooler weather to the country as a result of an increased cloud cover that acts as a blockage of the intense sunshine of the tropics by blocking much of the suns rays in the rainy season; this in turn cools the land, and the winds above the ground remain cool thereby making for cooler temperatures during the rainy season. But afternoons in the rainy season can be hot and humid. In the rainy season it is damp, and the rainfalls are usually abundant.

The dry season of Nigeria is a period of little cloud cover in the southern part of Nigeria to virtually no cloud cover in the northern part of Nigeria. The sun shines through the atmosphere with little obstructions from the clear skies making the dry season in Nigeria a period of warm weather conditions. In the middle of the dry season around December, the dust brought in by the Harmattan partially blocks the sun's rays, which lowers temperatures.

Temperatures on the Jos plateau ranges between 16 °C to 25 °C which are cool all year round. Temperate weather conditions occur on the highlands along the Nigeria Cameroon border, in the eastern part of Nigeria. The climate on these highlands is temperate all year round. The major highlands in this region are the Obudu Plateau above , Mambilla Plateau above  and Mt. Chappal Waddi above .

Examples

Topography 

Nigeria's most expansive topographical region is that of the Niger and Benue River valleys, which merge into each other and form a "y" shaped confluence at Lokoja. Plains rise to the north of the valleys. To the southwest of the Niger there is "rugged" highland, and to the southeast of the Benue hills and mountains are found all the way to the border with Cameroon. Coastal plains are found in both the southwest and the southeast.

Niger Delta 
The Niger Delta is located in the southern part of Nigeria. It is one of the world's largest arcuate fan-shaped river deltas. The riverine area of the Niger Delta is a coastal belt of swamps bordering the Atlantic. The mangrove swamps are vegetated tidal flats formed by a reticulate pattern of interconnected meandering creeks and tributaries of the Niger River. About 70% of Nigeria's crude oil and gas production is from the area. A recent global remote sensing analysis suggested that there were 1,244 km2 of tidal flats in Nigeria, making it the 27th ranked country in terms of tidal flat area.

Vegetation

Nigeria is covered by three types of vegetation: forests (where there is significant tree cover), savannahs (insignificant tree cover, with grasses and flowers located between trees), and montane land (least common and mainly found in the mountains near the Cameroon border. Both the forest zone and the savannah zone are divided into three parts.

Some of the forest zone's most southerly portion, especially around the Niger River and Cross River deltas, is mangrove swamp. North of this is fresh water swamp, containing different vegetation from the salt water mangrove swamps, and north of that is rain forest.

The savannah zone's three categories are divided into Guinean forest-savanna mosaic, made up of plains of tall grass which are interrupted by trees, the most common across the country; Sudan savannah, with short grasses and short trees; and Sahel savannah patches of grass and sand, found in the northeast.

Plant ecology 
Nigeria has numerous tree species, of which the majority of them are native while few are exotic. A high percentage of man-made forests in the country is dominated by exotic species. This culminated from the assumption that exotic trees are fast-growing. However, studies have also investigated the growth of indigenous trees in with that of exotic species. Due to overexploitation, the remaining natural ecosystems and primary forests in Nigeria are restricted to the protected areas which include one biosphere reserve, seven national parks, one World Heritage site, 12 Strict Nature Reserves (SNRs), 32 game reserves/wildlife sanctuaries, and hundreds of forest reserves. These are in addition to several ex-situ conservation sites such as arboreta, botanical gardens, zoological gardens, and gene banks managed by several tertiary and research institutions

Many countries in Africa are affected by Invasive Alien Species (IAS). In 2004, the IUCN–World Conservation Union identified 81 IAS in South Africa, 49 in Mauritius, 37 in Algeria and Madagascar, 35 in Kenya, 28 in Egypt, 26 in Ghana and Zimbabwe, and 22 in Ethiopia. However, very little is known about IAS in Nigeria, with most technical reports and literature reporting fewer than 10 invasive plants in the country. Aside from plant invaders, Rattus rattus and Avian influenza virus were also considered IAS in Nigeria. The initial entry of IAS into Nigeria was mainly through exotic plant introductions by the colonial rulers either for forest tree plantations or for ornamental purposes. The entry of exotic plants into Nigeria during the post-independence era was encouraged by increasing economic activity, the commencement of commercial oil explorations, the introduction through ships, and the introduction of ornamental plants by commercial floriculturists.

In the semi-arid and dry sub-humid savannas of West Africa, including Nigeria, numerous species of herbaceous dicots especially from the genera Crotalaria, Alysicarpus, Cassia and Ipomea are known to be widely used in livestock production. Quite often they are plucked or cut and fed either as fresh or conserved fodders. The utilization of these and many other herbs growing naturally within the farm environment is opportunistic.

Many other species native to Nigeria, including soybean and its varieties, serve as an important source of oil and protein in this region. There are also many plants with medicinal purposes that are used to aid the therapy in many organs. Some of these vegetations include Euphorbiaceae, which serve the purpose of aiding malaria, gastrointestinal disorders respectively and many other infections. Different stress factors such as droughts, low soil nutrients and susceptibility to pests have contributed to Maize plantations being an integral part of agriculture in this region.

As industrialization has increased, it has also put species of trees in the forest at risk of air pollution and studies have shown that in certain parts of Nigeria, trees have shown tolerance and grow in areas that have a significant amount of air pollution

Natural resources and land use
Nigeria's natural resources include but are not limited to petroleum, tin, columbite, iron ore, coal, limestone, lead, zinc, natural gas, hydropower, and arable land.

Extreme points 

This is a list of the extreme points of Nigeria, the points that are farther north, south, east or west than any other location.

 Northernmost point – unnamed location on the border with Niger immediately northwest of the town of Chadawa, Sokoto State.
 Easternmost point – unnamed location on the border with Cameroon immediately east of the village of Munyego, Borno State.
 Southernmost point – unnamed headland south of the town of Egeregere, Bayelsa State.
 Westernmost point – unnamed location on the border with Benin Republic immediately east of the Beninoise town of Jabata, Oyo State.

See also
Climate change in Nigeria

References